Benton Consolidated High School (BCHS) is a public high school located in Benton, Illinois, United States.  The campus is located in a city setting on Benton's east side, and has been operating (though in separate buildings) since 1888.

Benton Consolidated High School is in a school district separate from the K-8 schools in and around Benton.

Athletics 
The school's athletic teams (Benton Rangers) compete in the Southern Illinois River-to-River Conference. The Rangers' main rival is the West Frankfort Redbirds, located seven miles south of the BCHS campus.

Sports 
Benton High School offers the following sports:
 Baseball
 Basketball
 Cross country
 Football
 Golf
 Softball
 Track
 Volleyball
 Wrestling

State championships 
 Team
 1979-80 - IHSA Girls' basketball, Class A
 2004 - IDTA Competitive dance (pom division), Class 1A
 2005-06 - IHSA Girls' track & field, Class A
 2007-08 - IHSA Girls' track & field, Class A
 2013 - IDTA Competitive dance (hip hop division), Class 1A
 2014 - IDTA Competitive dance (hip hop division), Class 2A
 2015 - IDTA Competitive dance (hip hop division), Class 2A
 2020 - IDTA Competitive dance (hip hop division), Class A
 Individual
 2007-08 - Zach Wilson, IHSA wrestling, 140 pounds
 2005-08 - Courtney Smith, IHSA Girls' Track & Field
 2005-08 - Leah Orley, IHSA Girls' Track & Field
 2020-21 - Gabe Craig, IWCOA wrestling, 285 pounds 
 2021-22 - Cy Norman, IHSA Boys' Golf 
 2022-23 - Gavin Genisio, IHSA Boys' Cross Country 
 2022-23 - Mason Tieffel, IHSA Boys' wrestling, 138 pounds

Notable alumni 
 Lin Bolen, television executive
 Doug Collins, basketball coach and player
 Billy Grammer, country music singer
 Richard O. Hart, Illinois state representative and lawyer
 John Malkovich, actor
 Rich Yunkus, basketball player

History 

The first class to complete their course of study for Benton High School received their diplomas in March 1888, with 12 graduates.

In 1909, the school became known as Benton Township High School, with 73 students enrolled at the time, and the building located across the street from its current location where a football field for the school's football team currently sits.

The school's name was changed to Benton Consolidated High School in 1949.  The school district began to teach students from Benton, Ewing, Browning and Barren Township.

In 1973, the current high school building was completed.

References

External links 
Yearbook digitized collection at Benton Public Library

Public high schools in Illinois
Schools in Franklin County, Illinois